Mark Nofri  is the current head coach of the Sacred Heart Pioneers football team. He became the interim head coach in 2012, and was promoted to full head coach in 2013. He helped lead Sacred Heart to their first ever national ranking, as they were ranked #24 in The Sports Network FCS Poll on October 20, 2014.

Head coaching record

References

External links
 Sacred Heart profile

Year of birth missing (living people)
Living people
Canisius Golden Griffins football players
Hamilton Continentals football coaches
Sacred Heart Pioneers football coaches
Keene State College alumni
Sacred Heart University alumni